Chen Wenxing (born December 1964) is a Chinese textile engineer currently serving as president and deputy party chief of Zhejiang Sci-Tech University.

Biography
Chen was born in December 1964 in Shaoxing, Zhejiang. He earned a bachelor's degree in silk making in 1987, a master's degree in silk engineering in 1987, and a Doctor of Science degree in 1999, all from Zhejiang Sci-Tech University. In August 1992, he went to Shinshu University to study at the expense of international students prizes offered by Yue-Kong Pao and Doreen Pao. He was a visiting research fellow at Kyoto Institute of Technology between June 2000 and January 2001. In September 2010 he was appointed vice-president of Zhejiang Sci-Tech University, six years later, he was promoted to the president position.

Honours and awards
 2018 Science and Technology Progress Award of the Ho Leung Ho Lee Foundation
 November 22, 2019 Member of the Chinese Academy of Engineering (CAE)

References

1964 births
Living people
People from Shaoxing
Engineers from Zhejiang
Zhejiang Sci-Tech University alumni
Presidents of Zhejiang Sci-Tech University
Shinshu University alumni
Members of the Chinese Academy of Engineering